The  of Japan, commonly known as , is an annual nationwide high school baseball tournament. It is the largest scale amateur sport event in Japan.

Like most sports, the 2020 tournament was canceled in the wake of the COVID-19 pandemic.

Background 
In the past teams from overseas have participated in the tournament. Korea fielded teams from 1921 to 1940; both Taiwan and Manchuria had teams participate from 1923 to 1940.

The 49 schools taking part in the final tourney represent regional champions of each of the prefectures of Japan (with two from Hokkaidō and Tokyo).  From mid-June until July, regional tournaments are held to decide who is sent to Koshien.

The rules are the same as in the National High School Baseball Invitational Tournament. It is a single elimination tournament with nine inning games. Games are declared official after seven complete innings in the case of suspension (due to weather, et cetera), except for the championship game which must be played to completion.  For the regional tournaments, games are ended if one team leads by at least ten runs after five innings or seven runs after seven innings, except in the championship games. Designated hitters are not used. Four umpires are used, except for night games in which two outfield line umpires are added.

The first round pairings and byes are decided by lottery.  34 teams meet in the first round, and 15 teams with byes join at the second round (32 teams play in the second round).  Therefore, it takes either five or six wins for a team to win the championship.   Until 2002, the four quarter finals were played in one day, but this was changed to two a day over two days to give the players time off. If rainouts continue for more than three days, four games are played in one day. This occurred in 2003, so the first time the quarter finals were played over two days was actually 2004.  To accommodate the extra day, the long tradition of starting the tournament on August 8 was changed to start a day or two early.

Up to four games are played each day until the quarter finals.  The starting times of each day's games is shown below.  Following games are begun about 30 minutes after the previous game ends.  Due to the fast pace of the pitching, four games in one day are usually completed before sunset.

Extra innings
For tournaments previous to 1958 there were no extra inning limits for a game tied after nine innings of play. In 1933, Masao Yoshida had pitched a complete game during a 25 inning shutout in the semifinal, an all-time record. Yoshida had thrown 336 pitches during that game. 

In 1958, games were limited to 18 innings, with a full replay required after that on a future day.  The first pitcher to pitch a complete game 18 innings was Eiji Bando in a 1958 quarterfinal game. Daisuke Matsuzaka became the last pitcher to pitch a complete game over 15 innings (17 innings in 250 pitches, 1998).  

From 2000 to 2017, games were capped at 15 innings with a full replay required on a future day.  In 2006, the replay rule was implemented after a 15 inning tie in the final.

In 2018, the Japan High School Baseball Federation capped regular play to 12 innings (except in the championship final), but games will continue with the World Baseball Softball Confederation baseball tiebreaker with runners on first and second base (the previous two players relative to the current player in the batting order) starting with in the 13th inning.  

 If the game is suspended because of inclement weather or curfew while the game is in the tiebreaker, the game is declared a tie and a replay will be implemented at the earliest possible date.
 Pitchers are limited to fifteen innings.
 There is a 15 inning limit in the championship final.  A championship final replay will be scheduled in the next possible day.
 The championship final replay will use the WBSC tiebreaker at the 13th inning.

Traditions 

Every five years, the tournament celebrates the anniversary of the founding of the tournament, and a deep crimson is used for the championship flag for commemorative purposes.

For third year students, a loss at the tournament signifies an end to their high school baseball career, as there are no other major tournaments for the rest of their academic career. For It is common for players to cry in sorrow after tight games and/or their losses and to collect soil from the Koshien Stadium as a souvenir. For third year students, the dirt is kept as memorabilia, whereas lower grade players often use it as motivation to return to the tournament.

Finals

List of champions

In popular culture
Some of the most famous appearances of the Japanese High School Baseball Championship in popular culture are in the manga and anime series Touch, H2 and Cross Game by Mitsuru Adachi, Ace of Diamond by Yūji Terajima, and Major by Takuya Mitsuda. Those series follow the struggles of different high school teams' bids to make it to the Kōshien tournament.

The 2014 hit Taiwanese film Kano is based on the true story of a high school baseball team from the Kagi Nōrin (Agriculture) High School (now known as National Chiayi University) team in Kagi (now known as Chiayi), Taiwan who qualified for the tournament for the first time in 1931 after never having won a game in its first three seasons.  The team was made up of ethnic Japanese, Han Chinese and Taiwanese aborigines.  The team won three games to make it to the championship game before losing 4–0 to Chukyō Shōgyō from Nagoya.  This was the first of four appearances at the tournament for the Kano team, who later qualified in 1933, 1935 and 1936.

The Summer Koshien Tournament has had a longstanding tradition of launching the careers of many famous players, many of whom get drafted to the NPB and eventually make their way to the MLB. Names include 2001 AL Rookie of the Year and Most Valuable Player Ichiro Suzuki, 2006 World Baseball Classic MVP and 2007 World Series Champion Daisuke Matsuzaka, as well Yu Darvish, a five-time MLB All-Star, and Shohei Ohtani, who won the 2018 AL Rookie of the Year, and 2021 AL Most Valuable Player.

See also
High school baseball in Japan
Japan High School Baseball Federation
Japanese High School Baseball Invitational Tournament ("Spring Koshien")
Asahi Shimbun
Hanshin Koshien Stadium

Notes

External links

At Asahi Shimbun's website, complete scorebooks for the entire tournament are available.
 Kokoyakyu – High School Baseball A brief description of the Kōshien summer tournament

High school baseball in Japan
Baseball competitions in Japan
Tourist attractions in Hyōgo Prefecture
Sport in Hyōgo Prefecture
Recurring sporting events established in 1915
1915 establishments in Japan
Summer sports competitions